Children in a Chariot (Spanish - Niños del carretón) is a 1779 painting by Francisco de Goya. It is part of the third series of cartoons he produced for tapestries at the Royal Palace of El Pardo; the tapestry in question was to be positioned over a door.
The painting is in the Toledo Museum of Art.

See also
List of works by Francisco Goya

Bibliography

External links

1779 paintings
Paintings by Francisco Goya
Paintings in the collection of the Toledo Museum of Art
Paintings of children
Tapestry cartoons